Frederick Holman may refer to:
Frederick Van Voorhies Holman (1852–1927),  American lawyer and civic leader in Portland, Oregon
Frederick Holman (swimmer) (1885–1913), British breaststroke swimmer, gold medal winner in the 1908 Summer Olympics